The Battle of Kororāreka, or the Burning of Kororāreka, on 11 March 1845, was an engagement of the Flagstaff War in New Zealand. Following the establishment of British control of the islands, war broke out with a small group of the native population which resulted in the fall of the town of Kororāreka, present day Russell, to Māori warriors.

Background
Although he had been the first to sign the Treaty of Waitangi in February 1840, Nga Puhi chief Hōne Heke became increasingly unhappy with the outcome. He objected to the relocation of the capital to Auckland and changes to custom tariffs that caused a serious loss of revenue to the Ngāpuhi.

In July 1844, Heke and a group of warriors entered the town, and the Pakaraka chief Te Haratua cut down the flagstaff. Heke himself had set out to cut down the flagstaff, but had been persuaded by Archdeacon William Williams not to do so. Six months later on 10 January 1845 the flagstaff was cut down a second time - this time by Heke. A new and stronger flagstaff sheathed in iron was erected later that month and guard post built around it - but the next morning the flagstaff was felled for the third time.

Governor FitzRoy sent over to New South Wales for reinforcements. A block-house was built around the base, a guard of 20 soldiers was placed in this, and a fourth flagstaff erected.

Battle
On 11 March 1845 Hōne Heke and his men, along with Te Ruki Kawiti and his followers together attacked the town.

British forces were outnumbered. HM Sloop Hazard landed a party to aid the detachment of 96th Regiment commanded by Lieutenant Edward Barclay. In all there were about 140 soldiers, sailors and marines. The American sloop USS St. Louis, under Captain Isaac McKeever, USN, was also present and her crew assisted in evacuating the British subjects.

Heavy skirmishing lasted for a while until a large explosion destroyed all of the defender's reserve ammunition. The explosion also set a building on fire which spread. At about that time the British had begun to withdraw to the safety of the ships anchored in the bay and evacuate the civilian population. HMS Hazard then bombarded Māori positions.

Ten military defenders and three civilians were killed in action or died of wounds. At least thirty-six were variously wounded. The town was mostly destroyed after evacuation and over the following days.

Memorial
 
Six men from the Hazard who died in the action are remembered by a grave marker at Christ Church, Russell. The last two verses of the poem England's Dead by Felicia Hemans are inscribed on the marker in memory of them:

The warlike of the isles,The men of field and wave!Are not the rocks their funeral piles,The seas and shores their grave?Go, stranger! track the deep,Free, free the white sail spread!Wave may not foam, nor wild wind sweep,Where rest not England's dead.

Variation in the verses appear in visitor observations and through marker restoration since 1845.

See also
New Zealand Wars

References

Kororareka
Kororareka
Kororareka
Kororareka
Kororareka
Flagstaff War
1845 in New Zealand
March 1845 events